Sir James Jacob Gilchrist Berry (born 29 December 1978) is a British Conservative Party politician and former solicitor who served as Chairman of the Conservative Party and Minister without Portfolio from 6 September to 25 October  2022. He previously served as Minister of State for the Northern Powerhouse and Local Growth from 2017 to 2020 in the governments of Theresa May and Boris Johnson.

Berry has been the Member of Parliament (MP) for Rossendale and Darwen in Lancashire since the 2010 general election, when he defeated the sitting Labour Party MP Janet Anderson by a majority of 4,493 votes.

Early life
Berry was born on 29 December 1978 in Liverpool and privately educated at Liverpool College, before studying for a law degree at Sheffield University. He trained to be a solicitor  in Chester and in the City of London, qualifying as a solicitor in 2003. He worked for a number of legal practices, specialising in planning law.

Parliamentary career
Berry was elected in the general election of 2010 as MP for Rossendale and Darwen, beating incumbent MP Janet Anderson, who had held the seat for 18 years. Berry overturned a Labour majority of 3,616 to win by 4,493 votes, an 8.9% swing to the Conservatives.

In 2010, he was appointed Parliamentary Private Secretary (PPS) to Grant Shapps, the Minister for Housing and Local Government at the Department of Communities and Local Government, following Shapps to the Cabinet Office in 2012.

In April 2013, the Prime Minister, David Cameron, asked Berry to join the Number 10 Policy Unit, headed by Jo Johnson. His roles in this position included advising the Prime Minister on housing, regional growth and local government.

Berry sponsored the Local Government (Religious etc. Observances) Act 2015, which gave councils the right to hold religious prayers at the start of meetings.

In the general election of 2015, Berry was returned as MP for Rossendale and Darwen with an increased majority of 5,654. From July 2015 until January 2017, Berry served on the Parliamentary Finance Committee.

In May 2016, it emerged that Berry was one of a number of Conservative MPs being investigated by police in the United Kingdom general election, 2015 party spending investigation, for allegedly spending more than the legal limit on constituency election campaign expenses. However, in April 2017, Lancashire Police confirmed that no further action would be taken.

Berry was opposed to Brexit prior to the 2016 referendum. Berry was again returned as MP in June 2017, but with a reduced majority of 3,216.

Junior Minister 
Following the 2017 election, Prime Minister Theresa May appointed Berry as Parliamentary Under-Secretary of State for the Northern Powerhouse and Local Growth, making him the third Northern Powerhouse minister in the space of two years. In March 2018, he described campaigners who forced the aerospace firm BAE Systems to withdraw as a sponsor of a flagship arts festival in North East England as "subsidy addicted artists" and "snowflakes".

Upon the accession of Boris Johnson to the premiership, Berry was promoted to Minister of State, with attendance at cabinet meetings. He was appointed to the Privy Council the next day. He resigned from government in February 2020 after refusing a move to a ministerial office at the Foreign and Commonwealth Office in a cabinet reshuffle.

Chairman of the Conservative Party 

On 6 September 2022, following the Conservative Party leadership election, the new Prime Minister Liz Truss appointed Berry to her government. He joined the Cabinet as Minister without Portfolio, and he was also appointed to the party role of Chairman of the Conservative Party.

Speaking on Sky News on 2 October 2022 about the approach the Government of Liz Truss was taking to enable households to afford their utility bills, Berry said that people could either cut their consumption or get a higher-paid job. He later apologised, describing his remarks as "clumsy".

Return to the backbenches

On 25 October 2022, Berry stood down as Chairman of the Conservative Party upon the ascension of Rishi Sunak to the premiership. Berry returned to the backbenches.

Personal life
Berry lives in Rossendale and London. He married Charlotte Alexa in 2009. They were divorced in September 2016. He has been married to Alice Robinson since May 2018. She was previously Boris Johnson's parliamentary office manager. The couple have three children. On 14 October 2022 it was announced that Berry had been knighted.

Notes

References

External links

 Jake Berry's Facebook page
 Jake Berry on Twitter
 Jake Berry's website
 Rossendale and Darwen Conservative Association website
 

1978 births
Living people
People educated at Liverpool College
Alumni of the University of Sheffield
Conservative Party (UK) MPs for English constituencies
UK MPs 2010–2015
UK MPs 2015–2017
UK MPs 2017–2019
UK MPs 2019–present
English solicitors
Lawyers from Liverpool
Politicians awarded knighthoods
Knights Bachelor
Alumni of the University of Chester
Members of the Privy Council of the United Kingdom
Chairmen of the Conservative Party (UK)